Puya olivacea is a species in the genus Puya. This species is endemic to Bolivia. The only known occurrences of it are in the mountainous region in the geographic center of the country.

References

olivacea
Flora of Bolivia